Timmy Torres (born September 21, 1967, in Fresno, California), professionally known as Timmy T, is a freestyle performer and musician. Timmy T had a Billboard Hot 100 #1 single with "One More Try" in 1991.

Career
Timmy T started out in the 1980s in small rap groups in Fresno, but felt that he would rather do dance music. He purchased a Moog synthesizer and a Roland TR-808 drum machine at a pawn shop, and recorded his first single, "Time After Time", in his garage. He originally recorded the song for his girlfriend  and after his girlfriend liked it he decided getting that single pressed on vinyl. He rode his motorcycle to a local Fresno radio station to ask them to play his song. After the DJ played the song, there were many calls requesting who was performing that song. The DJ recommended that Timmy T take his record to radio stations in Los Angeles for more exposure. After Los Angeles pop station Power 106 played the record, it received airplay from several more stations throughout the country including Hot 97 in New York. Timmy got a record deal with Quality Records, and "Time After Time" went on to peak at #40 on the Billboard Hot 100 singles chart. 

His next single "What Will I Do", made it to #96 on the Billboard Hot 100 singles chart.

He released another single at the end of 1990, the ballad "One More Try", which proved to be much more successful than his first single, selling over a million copies and climbing to the top of the Billboard charts the following year. The success of the single drove the album, also named "Time After Time," to the #46 spot on the Billboard 200 albums chart.

He recorded his first album Time After Time, featuring the title track (his first single), "What Will I Do", "One More Try", and "Over and Over". None of the singles from his second album, All For Love, reached the charts, however his song "Over You" was featured in the motion picture The Raffle in the company of Elton John. The other singles of the second album were "Cry a Million Tears" and a cover of the song originally by Eric Carmen "Boats Against the Current". A year after the release of his second album, he distanced himself from the spotlight to focus on the birth of his son.

In 2018 he appeared on Tosh.0 web redemption reunion spectacular September 18, 2018, singing "One More Try".List of Tosh.0 episodes#cite note-283

As of 2019, Timmy T was still performing along with other freestyle acts from the late 80s and early 90s.

Discography

Studio albums

Compilation albums

Singles

Music videos

See also
List of artists who reached number one in the United States

References

External links

American freestyle musicians
American male pop singers
American rappers of Mexican descent
Musicians from Fresno, California
1967 births
Living people
21st-century American rappers
21st-century American male musicians
Rappers from California
Hispanic and Latino American rappers